Alijuq (also Romanized as ‘Alījūq) is a village in Tork-e Gharbi Rural District, Jowkar District, Malayer County, Hamadan Province, Iran. At the 2006 census, its population was 171, in 44 families.
The common language of this village is Kurdish and people speak Kurdish in their daily work.

References 

Populated places in Malayer County